William Cowie may refer to:
 William Cowie (bishop), New Zealand bishop
 William Cowie (merchant), Scottish engineer, mariner, and businessman
 William Cowie (rugby union), Scottish rugby union player
 Willie Cowie, shinty player